Sandhill St. John's wort is a common name for several plants and may refer to:

Hypericum lloydii
Hypericum tenuifolium